The Zagros Mountains mouse-like hamster (Calomyscus bailwardi) is a relatively little-known rodent which was the first species of mouse-like hamster to be described. The species is distributed throughout much of southern Iran, particularly in the Zagros mountains.  It is also known as the Iranian mouse-like hamster, though there are several species of mouse-like hamster found in different parts of Iran.

This is the largest species of mouse-like hamster.  They are dark grey on top and white underneath.  They are found in habitat ranging from barren rocky hillsides to wetter regions.  They are known to feed on herbs and grass seed.

Graphodatsky et al. (2000) recovered three distinct karyotypes from different regions throughout the range of C. bailwardi (2n=37, FNa=44; 2n=52, FNa=56; 2n=50, FNa=50).  This may suggest that further taxonomic revision is required.  Vorontsov et al. (1979) emphasized how little is known about the species and that the current definition is based largely on distribution.

Many sources still refer to all members of Calomyscus as part of the species Calomyscus bailwardi.

References

 
Graphodotsky, A. S., et al. 2000. Comparative cytogenetics of hamsters of the genus Calomyscus. Cytogenetics and Cell Genetics, 88:296-304.
Lay, D. M. 1967. A study of the mammals of Iran resulting from the Street Expedition of 1962-1963. Fieldiana: Zoology, 54:1-282.

Schlitter, D. A. and H. W. Setzer. 1973. New Rodents (Mammalia: Cricetidae, Muridae) from Iran and Pakistan. Proceedings of the Biological Society of Washington, 86:163-174.
Vorontsov, N. N., I. Kartavtseva, and E. G. Potapova. 1979. [Systematics of the genus Calomyscus. 1. Karyological differentiation of the sibling species from Transcaucasia and Turkmenia and a review of species in the genus Calomyscus] (in Russian). Zoologichaskii Zhurual, 58:1391-1397.

Mouse-like hamsters
Mouse-like Hamster, Zagros Mountains
Fauna of Iran
Mammals described in 1905
Taxa named by Oldfield Thomas